Glenn Davis is an American actor and producer, and the Artistic Director of Steppenwolf Theatre Company — the first person of color in the company's history to assume this position. Davis is a partner at Cast Iron Entertainment with Sterling K. Brown, Brian Tyree Henry, Jon Michael Hill, Andre Holland, and Tarell Alvin McCraney, and the collective is in residence at Geffen Playhouse in Los Angeles. He is also an artistic associate at the Young Vic Theatre in London and the Vineyard Theatre in New York.

Education
Born in Oceanside, California, Glenn Davis grew up in the Chatham neighborhood on Chicago's South Side. He attended the University of Chicago Laboratory Schools, where he currently sits on the Alumni Association Executive Board. Davis earned his BFA in Acting at The Theatre School at DePaul University .
He is also a graduate of the Birmingham Conservatory of Classical Theatre at the Stratford Festival in and is the first African American to do so.

Career
Davis is an accomplished actor, producer, and theatre leader who has worked with organizations such as Williamstown Theatre Festival, Congo Square Theatre Company, Stratford Festival, The Young Vic, The Shakespeare Company, Steppenwolf Theatre Company, Vineyard Theatre, and MCC Theatre. 
Davis garnered widespread acclaim on Broadway in Rajiv Joseph's play Bengal Tiger at the Baghdad Zoo alongside award-winning actor Robin Williams.
His TV work includes the Showtime series Billions, The Good Wife Jericho, The Unit and 24. 
He was named an Ensemble Member at Steppenwolf Theatre Company in 2017 and has since starred in critically-acclaimed productions such as The Christians, Head of Passes, The Brother/Sister Plays, Downstate (also at the National Theatre in London and Playwrights Horizons in New York) , King James (also at Center Theatre Group in Los Angeles and Manhattan Theatre Club in New York) . 
In 2021, Davis was appointed Artistic Director of Steppenwolf Theatre Company, serving alongside Audrey Francis. In the same year, he and longtime collaborator, Tarell Alvin McCraney, launched their production company, Chatham Grove, and its corresponding multi-year overall deal with UCP, a division of Universal Studio Group .

References

External links 
 Member Profiles Glenn Davis

Living people
American male film actors
People from South Holland, Illinois
Year of birth missing (living people)
American male stage actors
Male actors from Illinois